Yevgeny Ivanovich Shaposhnikov (3 February 1942 – 8 December 2020) was a Soviet and Russian military leader and business figure. He was awarded the rank of Marshal of Aviation in 1991. He was the final Minister of Defense of the Soviet Union.

Early years
Shaposhnikov was born on a farm near Aksay in Rostov Oblast, Russia. He graduated from the Kharkov Higher Military Aviation School in 1963 and the Gagarin Air Force Academy in 1969.

Military career
Shaposhnikov joined the Soviet Air Force and rose through the ranks. In 1987–1989, Yevgeny Shaposhnikov was the air force commander of the Group of Soviet Forces in Germany (16th Air Army?). In July 1990, he was appointed commander-in-chief of the Soviet Air Force.

Political career

Soviet Union
In August 1991 – February 1992, Yevgeny Shaposhnikov held the post of Minister of Defence of Soviet Union (and thus the last Soviet Defence Minister).  Recognized the Belovezhsky agreement on the termination of the existence of the USSR immediately after its signing on 8 December 1991. On 21 December 1991, simultaneously with the accession of 8 republics to the Commonwealth of Independent States (all, except for Georgia and the Baltic republics that previously left the USSR) a protocol was signed on the assignment of temporary command of the Armed Forces of the USSR to Shaposhnikov. Around the end of January 1992, the Ministry of Defense of the disintegrated USSR began to de facto call itself the main command of the CIS Armed Forces. In the Decree of the President of Russia of 4 January 1992, Marshal Shaposhnikov was mentioned as the head of the Ministry of Defense of the former USSR.

Commonwealth of Independent States/Russian Federation
Only on 14 February 1992 did the Council of CIS Heads of State officially appoint Shaposhnikov Commander-in-Chief of the Joint Armed Forces of the CIS, and only on March 20 of the same year, on the basis of the USSR Ministry of Defense, the General Command of the CIS Joint Armed Forces was officially created.

In June–September 1993, Yevgeny Shaposhnikov held the post of the secretary of the Security Council of the Russian Federation.

Business career
In January 1994, Shaposhnikov became a representative of the President of the Russian Federation in the main arms-exporting company Rosvooruzhenie. In November 1995 – March 1997 he was the CEO (General Director) of Aeroflot airline company. He has been employed as an adviser of the President of the Russian Federation on matters of aviation and space exploration since March 1997.

Death
Shaposhnikov died on 8 December 2020 in Moscow from COVID-19 during the COVID-19 pandemic in Russia.  He was buried in Troyekurovskoye Cemetery on 11 December.

References

External links
  Biography

|-

1942 births
2020 deaths
Soviet Air Force marshals
Soviet Ministers of Defence
Russian politicians
Aeroflot
Recipients of the Order "For Service to the Homeland in the Armed Forces of the USSR", 2nd class
Deaths from the COVID-19 pandemic in Russia
Soviet military personnel of the Soviet–Afghan War
Burials in Troyekurovskoye Cemetery